General elections were held in the Netherlands on 17 May 1853. They followed the dissolution of the House of Representatives as a result of a government crisis caused by the restoration of the episcopal hierarchy. 

The result of the elections was a defeat for Prime Minister Johan Rudolph Thorbecke and his liberals. Only the province of Groningen and Twente remained a liberal stronghold. The conservative Van Hall-Donker Curtius cabinet thus received ample support in the House of Representatives and Floris Adriaan van Hall became Prime Minister. However, the restoration of the episcopal hierarchy that had caused the government crisis was not reversed, although the Roman Catholic Church was restricted in its freedom of movement by the introduction of the Law on Church Societies.

Background
During the Constitutional Reform of 1848, the Catholic Church was allowed to determine ecclesiastical divisions within the Netherlands in the context of the separation of church and state. In 1853 this law was applied, and Pope Pius IX divided the Netherlands into five dioceses, including an archdiocese in Utrecht. Among the Dutch Protestants, there was much dislike of this action, which culminated in the April movement. The submission of the complaints by the April movement to King William III led to a crisis between the king and the Thorbecke I cabinet, which felt that the king had answered the April movement too positively and had not been sufficiently neutral. As a result, the cabinet resigned and the House of Representatives was dissolved.

According to the then electoral law, this was an exceptional situation: normally half the House was elected every two years, and not the House as a whole.

Results

By district

Notes

References

General elections in the Netherlands
Netherlands
1853 in the Netherlands
May 1853 events
Election and referendum articles with incomplete results